Aby Moritz Warburg, better known as Aby Warburg, (June 13, 1866 – October 26, 1929) was a German art historian and cultural theorist who founded the Kulturwissenschaftliche Bibliothek Warburg (Library for Cultural Studies), a private library, which was later moved to the Warburg Institute, London. At the heart of his research was the legacy of the classical world, and the transmission of classical representation, in the most varied areas of Western culture through to the Renaissance.

Warburg described himself as: "Amburghese di cuore, ebreo di sangue, d'anima Fiorentino" ('Hamburger at heart, Jew by blood, Florentine in spirit').

Life 
Aby Warburg was born in Hamburg into the wealthy Warburg family of German Jewish bankers. His ancestors had come to Germany from Italy in the 17th century and settled in the town of Warburg in Westphalia, taking on the town's name as their family name. In the 18th century the Warburgs moved to Altona near Hamburg.

Two brothers Warburg founded the banking firm M. M. Warburg & Co in Hamburg, which today again has an office there. Aby Warburg was the first of seven children born to Moritz Warburg, director of the Hamburg bank, and his wife Charlotte, née Oppenheim. Aby Warburg showed an early interest in literature and history and the second eldest son, Max Warburg went into the Hamburg bank, younger brothers Paul and Felix also entered banking. Max Warburg established the Warburg family bank as a "global player".

Childhood and youth 
Warburg grew up in a conservative Jewish home environment. Early on he demonstrated an unstable, unpredictable and volatile temperament. Warburg as a child reacted against the religious rituals which were punctiliously observed in his family, and rejected all career plans envisaged for him. He did not want to be a rabbi, as his grandmother wished, nor a doctor or lawyer.

Aby Warburg met with resistance from his relatives, but he forced through his plans to study art history. Aby famously made a deal with his brother Max to forfeit his right, as the eldest son, to take over the family firm, in return for an undertaking on Max's part to provide him  with all the books he ever needed.

Studies 
In 1886 Warburg began his study of art history, history and archaeology in Bonn and attended the lectures on the history of religion by Hermann Usener, those on cultural history by Karl Lamprecht and on art history by Carl Justi. He continued his studies in Munich and with Hubert Janitschek in Strasbourg, completing under him his dissertation on Botticelli's paintings The Birth of Venus and Primavera.

From 1888 to 1889 he studied the sources of these pictures at the Kunsthistorisches Institut in Florence. He was now interested in applying the methods of natural science to the human sciences. The dissertation was completed in 1892 and printed in 1893. Warburg's study introduced into art history a new method, that of iconography or iconology, later developed by Erwin Panofsky. After receiving his doctorate Warburg studied for two semesters at the Medical Faculty of the University of Berlin, where he attended lectures on psychology. During this period he undertook a further trip to Florence.

Travels in the United States 
In 1895, Aby's brother Paul Warburg married Nina Loeb (daughter of Solomon Loeb) in New York City, marking the beginning of Aby Warburg's travels in the southwestern United States. Before heading West, he had met veteran anthropologists James Mooney and Frank Hamilton Cushing at the Smithsonian Institution, both of whom contributed to early ethnographies of US American Indians.

Warburg's first stop in his travels was Mesa Verde to see the Ancestral Pueblo cliff dwellings. He continued on to visit a number of Pueblo villages in New Mexico before stopping in San Ildefonso, where he had the opportunity to photograph a traditional Antelope dance. In Cochiti, Warburg convinced a priest and his son to illustrate their people's cosmology; their drawing highlighted the importance of meteorological phenomena and serpents to their cultural worldview. Warburg's interest in Hopi snake imagery was also apparent through his interest in the snake dance of the Arizona Hopi. He had first heard of this tradition through discussions with Mooney, and although he never witnessed the dance firsthand it remained influential to his writings about the Hopi. In general, the Hopi culture represented a recurring object of Warburg's fascination: their architecture, rituals, masks, symbolism, and the ancient tradition of pottery painting (a tradition that was undergoing a revival, partly thanks to Nampeyo). Some of Warburg's observations of the Hopi people were informed by the Mennonite missionary, evangelist and ethnographer Heinrich R. Voth. Voth shared Warburg's interest in Hopi religion and culture and provided Warburg with details about the famous Hopi snake dance, as well as introducing him to Hopi people and giving him access to sacred Hopi ceremonies and photographic opportunities. In Oraibi, the last stop in southwestern voyage, Warburg attended and diligintly recorded his experience at Kachina dances. 

Warburg's American travels served as the inspiration for his first forays into photography and ethnography, but aside from two photographic exhibits, his personal accounts of his experiences among the Pueblo and Hopi peoples remained largely unexamined for nearly three decades. He ended up reviving his travel notes for his now-famous 1923 lecture on the Hopi snake dance ritual. In it, he stressed the kinship of religious thinking in Athens and Oraibi. The lecture also became the grounds by which Warburg was released from his psychiatric treatment at the Bellevue Sanitorium.

Florence 

In 1897 Warburg married, against his father's will, the painter and sculptor Mary Hertz, daughter of Adolph Ferdinand Hertz, a Hamburg senator and member of the Synod of the Evangelical-Lutheran Church in Hamburg, and Maria Gossler, both members of the traditional Hanseatic elite of Hamburg. The couple had three children: Marietta (1899–1973), Max Adolph (1902–1974) and Frede C. Warburg (1904–2004). In 1898 Warburg and his wife took up residence in Florence. While Warburg was repeatedly plagued by depression, the couple enjoyed a lively social life. Among their Florentine circle could be counted the sculptor Adolf von Hildebrand, the writer Isolde Kurz, the English architect and antiquary Herbert Horne, the Dutch Germanist André Jolles and his wife Mathilde Wolff-Mönckeberg, and the Belgian art historian Jacques Mesnil. The most famous Renaissance specialist of the time, the American Bernard Berenson, was likewise in Florence at this period. Warburg, for his part, renounced all sentimental aestheticism, and in his writings criticised a vulgarised idealisation of an individualism that had been imputed to the Renaissance in the work of Jacob Burckhardt.

During his years in Florence Warburg investigated the living conditions and business transactions of Renaissance artists and their patrons as well as, more specifically, the economic situation in the Florence of the early Renaissance and the problems of the transition from the Middle Ages to the early Renaissance. A further product of his Florentine period was his series of lectures on Leonardo da Vinci, held in 1899 at the Kunsthalle Hamburg. In his lectures he discussed Leonardo's study of medieval bestiaries as well as his engagement with the classical theory of proportion of Vitruvius. He also occupied himself with Botticelli's engagement with the Ancients evident in the representation of the clothing of figures. Feminine clothing takes on a symbolic meaning in Warburg's famous essay, inspired by discussions with Jolles, on the nymphs and the figure of the Virgin in Domenico Ghirlandaio's fresco in Santa Maria Novella in Florence. The contrast evident in the painting between the constricting dress of the matrons and the lightly dressed, quick-footed figure on the far right serves as an illustration of the virulent discussion around 1900 concerning the liberation of female clothing from the standards of propriety imposed by a reactionary bourgeoisie.

Return to Hamburg 
In 1902 the family returned to Hamburg, and Warburg presented the findings of his Florentine research in a series of lectures, but at first did not take on a professorship or any other academic position. He rejected a call to a professorship at the University of Halle in 1912. He became a member of the board of the Völkerkundemuseum, with his brother Max sponsored the foundation of the "Hamburger wissenschatflichen Stiftung" (1907) and the foundation of a university in Hamburg, which succeeded in 1919, and at which he took up a professorship. At this period signs of a mental illness were present which affected his activities as a researcher and teacher.

He had manic depression and symptoms of schizophrenia, and was hospitalized in Ludwig Binswanger's neurological clinic in Kreuzlingen, Switzerland in 1921. There he was visited by Emil Kraepelin who did not confirm the diagnosis of schizophrenia and suggested Warburg was in a mixed manic-depressive state, a diagnosis with a more positive prognosis. Indeed, his mental conditions improved also thanks to the support of the philosopher Ernst Cassirer, who visited him in the clinic: "Warburg was highly relieved that Cassirer fully understood his plans to restart his research, that Cassirer highlighted the importance of Warburg's ongoing scientific efforts, and felt he could contribute substantively to the art history discourse"  After his release from Binswanger's clinic in 1924, Warburg held occasional lectures and seminars between 1925 and 1929, which took place in a private circle or in his library.

Warburg died in Hamburg of a heart attack on 26 October 1929.

Last project: Mnemosyne Atlas

In December 1927, Warburg started to compose a work in the form of a picture atlas named Mnemosyne. It consisted of 40 wooden panels covered with black cloth, on which were pinned nearly 1,000 pictures from books, magazines, newspaper and other daily life sources. These pictures were arranged according to different themes:

 Coordinates of memory
 Astrology and mythology
 Archaeological models
 Migrations of the ancient gods
 Vehicles of tradition
 Irruption of antiquity
 Dionysiac formulae of emotions
 Nike and Fortuna
 From the Muses to Manet
 Dürer: the gods go North
 The age of Neptune
 "Art officiel" and the baroque
 Re-emergence of antiquity
 The classical tradition today

There were no captions and only a few texts in the atlas. "Warburg certainly hoped that the beholder would respond with the same intensity to the images of passion or of suffering, of mental confusion or of serenity, as he had done in his work." Mnemosyne Atlas was left unfinished when Warburg died in 1929.

See also 
 Aby Warburg Prize
 Jean Seznec
 Pathosformel
 Warburg Haus, Hamburg
 Warburg Institute

References

Bibliography

Writings 
Das Schlangenritual. Ein Reisebericht. Mit einem Nachwort von Ulrich Raulff. Berlin 1988.
Gesammelte Schriften (Studienausgabe), Berlin: Akademie-Verlag (since 2015 De Gruyter):
 Vol. I.1,2: Die Erneuerung der heidnischen Antike. Beiträge zur Geschichte der europäischen Literatur. Edited by Horst Bredekamp and Michael Diers, 2 Vol. [reprint of the first edition 1932]. Berlin 1998.
 Vol. II.1: Der Bilderatlas MNEMOSYNE. Ed. by Martin Warnke and Claudia Brink. Berlin 2000.
 Vol. II.2: Bilderreihen und Ausstellungen. Ed. by Uwe Fleckner and Isabella Woldt. Berlin 2012.
 Vol. III.2: Bilder aus dem Gebiet der Pueblo-Indianer in Nord-Amerika. Ed. by Uwe Fleckner. Berlin 2018.
 Vol. IV: Fragmente zur Ausdruckskunde. Ed. by Ulrich Pfisterer and Hans Christian Hoenes. Berlin 2015.
 Vol. V: Briefe. Ed. by Michael Diers and Steffen Haug with Thomas Helbig. Berlin 2021. 
 Vol. VII: Tagebuch der Kulturwissenschaftlichen Bibliothek Warburg. Ed. by Karen Michels and Charlotte Schoell-Glass. Berlin 2001.

Literature 
Bibliographies
 Dieter Wuttke: Aby-M.-Warburg-Bibliographie 1866 bis 1995. Werk und Wirkung; mit Annotationen. Baden-Baden: Koerner 1998. 
 Björn Biester / Dieter Wuttke: Aby M. Warburg-Bibliographie 1996 bis 2005 : mit Annotationen und mit Nachträgen zur Bibliographie 1866 bis 1995. Koerner, Baden-Baden 2007, 
 Thomas Gilbhard: Warburg more bibliographico, in: Nouvelles de la République des Lettres, 2008/2.
 Warburg-Bibliography 2006ff online

Biographies
 Ernst H. Gombrich: Aby Warburg. An Intellectual Biography., The Warburg Institute, London, 1970; German Edition Frankfurt, 1981, reissued Hamburg 2006. (partly as PDF, 2.014 KB)
 Bernd Roeck: Der junge Aby Warburg, München, 1997.
 Carl Georg Heise: Persönliche Erinnerungen an Aby Warburg, Hrsg. und kommentiert von Björn Biester und Hans-Michael Schäfer,. (Gratia. Bamberger Schriften zur Renaissanceforschung 43). Wiesbaden, Harrassowitz, 2005.
 Mark A. Russell: Between Tradition and Modernity: Aby Warburg and the Public Purposes of Art in Hamburg, 1896-1918, Berghahn Books, New York and Oxford, 2007.
 Karen Michels: Aby Warburg — Im Bannkreis der Ideen, C.H. Beck, München, 2007.
 Marie-Anne Lescourret, Aby Warburg ou la tentation du regard, Hazan, Paris, 2013.

Monographs
 Silvia Ferretti: Cassirer, Panofsky and Warburg: Symbol, Art and History. Yale U.P., London, New Haven 1989.
 Horst Bredekamp, Michael Diers, Charlotte Schoell-Glass (eds.): Aby Warburg. Akten des internat. Symposiums Hamburg 1990. Weinheim 1991.
 P. Schmidt: Aby Warburg und die Ikonologie. Mit e. Anhang unbekannter Quellen zur Geschichte der Internat. Gesellschaft für ikonographische Studien von D. Wuttke. 2. Aufl. Wiesbaden 1993.
 Charlotte Schoell-Glass, Aby Warburg und der Antisemitismus. Kulturwissenschaft als Geistespolitik. Fischer Taschenbuch, Frankfurt am Main 1998. 
 Georges Didi-Huberman, L'image survivante: histoire de l'art et temps des fantômes selon Aby Warburg. Les Éd. de Minuit, Paris 2002. 
 Hans-Michael Schäfer: Die Kulturwissenschaftliche Bibliothek Warburg. Geschichte und Persönlichkeit der Bibliothek Warburg mit Berücksichtigung der Bibliothekslandschaft und der Stadtsituation der Freien u. Hansestadt Hamburg zu Beginn des 20. Jahrhunderts. Logos Verlag, Berlin 2003.

 Ludwig Binswanger: Aby Warburg: La guarigione infinita. Storia clinica di Aby Warburg. A cura di Davide Stimilli. Vicenza 2005 (German: Die unendliche Heilung. Aby Warburgs Krankengeschichte, Zürich/Berlin: diaphanes, 2007).
 Photographs at the Frontier, Nicholas Mann et alii eds., London 1990
 Cora Bender, Thomas Hensel, Erhard Schüttpelz (eds.): Schlangenritual. Der Transfer der Wissensformen vom Tsu'ti'kive der Hopi bis zu Aby Warburgs Kreuzlinger Vortrag. Akademie Verlag, Berlin 2007. 
 Wolfgang Bock: Urbild und magische Hülle.Aby Warburgs Theorie der Astrologie, in: Bock: Astrologie und Aufklärung. Über modernen Aberglauben, Stuttgart: Metzler 1995, pp. 265–254
 Wolfgang Bock: Verborgene Himmelslichter. Sterne als messianische Orientierung. Benjamin, Warburg, in: Bock: Walter Benjamin. Die Rettung der Nacht. Sterne, Melancholie und Messianismus, Bielefeld: Aisthesis, 2000, pp. 195–218
 Thomas Hensel: Wie aus der Kunstgeschichte eine Bildwissenschaft wurde: Aby Warburgs Graphien. Akademie Verlag, Berlin 2011

Essays
 Carlo Ginzburg, 'From Aby Warburg to E.H. Gombrich: A Problem of Method', Clues, Myths, and the Historical Method, John and Anne C. Tedeschi, trans, Baltimore: The Johns Hopkins University Press, 1986, 17-59
 Griselda Pollock, "Aby Warburg (1866–1929). 'Thinking Jewish' in Modernity", in: Jacques Picard et al. (eds.), Makers of Jewish Modernity: Thinkers, Artists, Leaders, and the World They Made, Princeton and Oxford 2016, pp. 108–125
 Massimo Colella, «Luce esterna (Mitra) e interna (G. Bruno)». Il viaggio bruniano di Aby Warburg, in «Intersezioni. Rivista di storia delle idee», XL, 1, 2020, pp. 33-56.

External links 

 
 Summary of writings
 Warburg, Aby M. (1866–1929) at www.astro.uni-bonn.de
  Mnemosyne: Meanderings Through Aby Warburg's Atlas – High quality scans and extensive readings of selected plates of Warburg's Mnemosyne Atlas (Cornell University Library / The Warburg Institute)
  engramma, an italian journal for Warburgian studies
 Warburg Institute
 Warburg, Aby. in the  Dictionary of Art Historians Lee Sorensen, ed.

1866 births
1929 deaths
German art historians
German male non-fiction writers
Jewish historians
Jews from Hamburg
People associated with the Warburg Institute
People with bipolar disorder
People with schizophrenia
Aby Warburg